The 2007 Speedway Grand Prix of Sweden was the third race of the 2007 Speedway Grand Prix season.  It took place on 26 May in the Smedstadium stadium in Eskilstuna, Sweden.

Starting positions draw 
The Speedway Grand Prix Commission has nominated Fredrik Lindgren (as Wild Card), Jonas Davidsson and Eric Andersson (both as Track Reserve).

(14) Rune Holta (Poland)
(9) Jarosław Hampel (Poland)
(4) Andreas Jonsson (Sweden)
(12) Bjarne Pedersen (Denmark)
(6) Hans N. Andersen (Denmark)
(13) Wiesław Jaguś (Poland)
(11) Scott Nicholls (United Kingdom)
(15) Chris Harris (United Kingdom)
(3) Nicki Pedersen (Denmark)
(2) Greg Hancock (United States)
(1) Jason Crump (Australia)
(8) Tomasz Gollob (Poland)
(10) Antonio Lindbäck (Sweden)
(16) Fredrik Lindgren (Sweden)
(5) Leigh Adams (Australia)
(7) Matej Žagar (Slovenia)
(17) Jonas Davidsson (Sweden)
(18) Erik Andersson (Sweden)

Wiesław Jaguś and Eric Andersson in 2007 season was a Smederna Eskilstuna's rider.

Heat details

Heat after heat 
 Holta, Jonsson, Hampel, B.Pedersen
 Andersen, Nicholls, Harris, Jaguś
 Hancock, Crump, Gollob, N.Pedersen
 Adams, Lindgren, Žagar, Lindbäck
 N.Pedersen, Andersen, Holta, Lindbäck
 Jaguś, Lindgren, Hancock, Hampel
 Adams, Crump, Jonsson, Nicholls
 Žagar, Harris, Gollob, B.Pedersen
 Jaguś, Žagar, Holta, Crump
 Andersen, Adams, Gollob, Hampel
 N.Pedersen, Lindgren, Harris, Jonsson
 Hancock, B.Pedersen, Lindbäck, Nicholls
 Lindgren, Gollob, Holta, Nicholls
 Hampel, Harris, Lindbäck, Crump (f)
 Andersen, Hancock, Žagar, Jonsson
 Adams, Davidsson (for Jaguś), B.Pedersen, N.Pedersen (x/f — in repeated heat); Jaguś (f/x)
 Holta, Harris, Adams, Hancock
 N.Pedersen, Nicholls, Hampel, Žagar
 Gollob, Jonsson, Lindbäck, Andersson (for Jaguś)
 Davidsson (for Crump), Andersen, Lindgren, B.Pedersen
Semi-finals:
 Andersen, N.Pedersen, Gollob, Holta
 Adams, Lindgren, Harris, Hancock 
Great Final:
 Adams (6), Andersen (4), Lindgren (2), N.Pedersen (0)

The intermediate classification

See also 
 List of Speedway Grand Prix riders

References 

Sw
2007
2007 in Swedish motorsport